Estonian mythology is a complex of myths belonging to the Estonian folk heritage and literary mythology. Information about the pre-Christian and medieval Estonian mythology is scattered in historical chronicles, travellers' accounts and in ecclesiastical registers. Systematic recordings of Estonian folklore started in the 19th century. Pre-Christian Estonian deities may have included a god known as Jumal or Taevataat ("Old man of the sky") in Estonian, corresponding to Jumala in Finnish, and Jumo in Mari.

Estonian mythology in old chronicles
According to the Chronicle of Henry of Livonia in 1225 the Estonians disinterred the enemy's dead and burned them. It is thought that cremation was believed to speed up the dead person's journey to the afterlife and by cremation the dead would not become earthbound spirits which were thought to be dangerous to the living.

Henry of Livonia also describes in his chronicle an Estonian legend originating from Virumaa in North Estonia - about a mountain and a forest where a god named Tharapita, worshipped by Oeselians, had been born.

The solstice festival of Midsummer celebrating the sun through solar symbols of bonfires, the tradition alive until the present day and numerous Estonian nature spirits: the sacred oak and linden have been described by Balthasar Russow in 1578.

Mythical motifs in folklore

Some traces of the oldest authentic myths may have survived in runic songs. There is a song about the birth of the world – a bird lays three eggs and starts to lay out the nestlings – one becomes Sun, one becomes Moon and one becomes the Earth. Other Finnic peoples also have myths according to which the world has emerged from an egg.

The world of the Estonians’ ancestors is believed to have turned around a pillar or a tree, to which the skies were nailed with the North Star. The Milky Way (Linnutee or Birds' Way in Estonian) was a branch of the World tree (Ilmapuu) or the way by which birds moved (and took the souls of the deceased to the other world). These myths were based on animistic beliefs.

Changes occurred in proto-Estonian mythology as a result of the contacts with Baltic and Germanic tribes, as well as the transition from hunting and gathering to farming. Personifications of celestial bodies, sky and weather deities and fertility gods gained importance in the world of the farmers. There may have been a sky and thunder god called Uku or Ukko, also called Vanaisa (Grandfather) or Taevataat (Sky Father). Proto Estonian pre-Christian deities may also have included a sky-god by name Jumal, known also by other Finnic peoples as Jumala in Finnish and Jumo in Mari.

Estonian legends about giants (Kalevipoeg, Suur Tõll, Leiger) may be a reflection of Germanic (especially Scandinavian) influences. Giants themselves in some stories stood as protectors against such Germanic influences, such as invasion. There are numerous legends interpreting various natural objects and features as traces of Kalevipoeg's deeds. The giant has merged with Christian Devil, giving birth to a new character – Vanapagan (a cunning demon living on his farm or manor) and his farm hand Kaval-Ants ("Crafty Hans").

Other mythical motifs from Estonian runic songs: 
 a mighty oak grows into the sky, is then felled and turned into various mythical objects 
 Sun, Moon and Star are the suitors of a young maiden, she finally accepts the Star
 a crafty blacksmith forges a woman of gold but is not able to give her a soul or a mind
 a holy grove starts to wither after having been desecrated by a love-making couple; only sacrificing nine brothers cleanses it
 mighty heroes are not able to kill a terrible giant ox, but a little brother is
 a woman is forced to kill her daughter who then goes to live in the heaven as the Air Maiden
 a girl finds a fish and asks her brother to kill it – there is a woman inside the fish
 young girls go out at night and young men from the holy grove (or the land of the dead) seduce them by offering them riches
 a lake travels to another place when it has been desecrated by an inconsiderate woman or an incestuous couple

It has been suggested by ethnologist and former president Lennart Meri (among others), that a Kaali meteorite which passed dramatically over populated regions and landed on the island of Saaremaa around 3,000-4,000 years ago was a cataclysmic event that may have influenced the mythology of Estonia and neighboring countries, especially those from whose vantage point a "sun" seemed to set in the east. In the Finnish national epic, the Kalevala, cantos 47, 48 and 49 can be interpreted as descriptions of the impact, the resulting tsunami and devastating forest fires. It has also been suggested that the Virumaa-born Oeselian god Tharapita is a reflection of the meteorite that entered the atmosphere somewhere near the suggested "birthplace" of the god and landed in Oesel.

Literary mythology
Friedrich Robert Faehlmann and Friedrich Reinhold Kreutzwald compiled the Estonian national epic Kalevipoeg out of numerous prosaic folk legends and runic verse imitations that they themselves had written. Faehlmann also wrote eight fictional myths combining motives of Estonian folklore (from the legends and folk songs), Finnish mythology (from Ganander's "Mythologia Fennica") and classical Greek mythology. Matthias Johann Eisen was another folklorist and writer who studied folk legends and reworked them into literary form. Many of their contemporary scholars accepted this mythopoeia as authentic Estonian mythology.

The Estonian literary mythology describes the following pantheon: The supreme god, the god of all living things, is Taara. He is celebrated in sacred oak forests around Tartu. The god of thunder is Uku. Uku's daughters are Linda and Jutta, the queen of the birds. Uku has two sons: Kõu (Thunder) and Pikker (Lightning). Pikker possesses a powerful musical instrument, which makes demons tremble and flee. He has a naughty daughter, Ilmatütar (Weather Maiden).

During the era of Estonian national awakening the elements in the literary mythology were quickly and readily incorporated into contemporary popular culture through media and school textbooks. It can be difficult to tell how much of Estonian mythology as we know it today was actually constructed in the 19th and early 20th century. Faehlmann even noted in the beginning of his Esthnische Sagen (Estonian Legends) that:"However, since Pietism has started to penetrate deep into the life of the people...[s]inging folk songs and telling legends have become forbidden for the people; moreover, the last survivals of pagan deities are being destroyed and there is no chance for historical research."Some constructed elements are loans from Finnish mythology and may date back to the common Baltic-Finnic heritage.

Estonian mythological and literary mythological beings, deities and legendary heroes

 Pikker (Äike) - Thunder
 Äiatar – a female demon, Devil's daughter
 Alevipoeg - Alev's son, a friend of Kalevipoeg
 Ebajalg - demonic whirlwind
 Ehaema - Mother Twilight, a nocturnal spirit or elf, encouraging spinning
 Eksitaja - an evil spirit who makes people lose their way in a forest or a bog
 Haldjas (the ruler) - elf, fairy, protector spirit of some place, person, plant or animal
 Hall - personification of malaria
 Hämarik - personification of dusk, a beautiful young maiden
 Hännamees – a demon who stole and brought food, money and other worldly goods to its maker and owner
 Hiid - a giant
 Hiiela - another world, land of the dead
 Hiieneitsid - maidens from the land of the dead
 Hiis - holy grove
 Hingeliblikas – a person's spirit in the form of a moth
 Hingeloom - a person's spirit in the form of an insect or a small animal
 Hoidja - protector, keeper
 Härjapõlvlane - leprechaun 
 Ilmaneitsi, Ilmatütar - Air Maiden, Sky Maiden
 Ilmarine, Ilmasepp - a mythical blacksmith who forged among other things the Sun and the Moon (cf. Ilmarinen)
 Ilo - Joy, the hostess of feasts
 Järvevana - Old Man from the Lake
 Jumal - God
 Jutta - queen of the birds, daughter of Taara
 Juudaline - demon
 Kaevukoll - bogeyman of the well
 Kaitsja - protector
 Kalevipoeg, Kalevine, Sohni, Soini, Osmi - giant hero, mythical ancient king of Estonia
 Kalm - grave; spirit of a dead person; ruler of the land of the dead
 Kalmuneiu - Maiden of the Grave; a girl from the land of the dead
 Katk - personification of plague
 Kaval-Ants (Crafty/Sly Hans) - wicked farm hand who deceives his master Vanapagan - the Devil
 Kodukäija - a restless visitant ghost
 Koerakoonlane - a demonic warrior with a dog snout
 Koit - personification of Dawn, a young man, eternal lover of Hämarik
 Koll - bogey
 Kolumats – bogeyman
 Kratt, Pisuhänd, Tulihänd, Hännamees, Puuk - a demon who stole and brought food, money and other worldly goods to its maker and owner in the form of a whirlwind or meteor-like tail of fire 
 Kuu - Moon
 Kõu -  Thunder; son of Uku, brother of Pikker
 Kääbas - grave, death spirit
 Külmking - a spirit of an unholy dead, eats children when they bother the forest spirits
 Lapi nõid - witch of Lapland
 Leiger (player) - a giant living in Hiiumaa island, younger brother of "Suur Tõll"
 Lendva - an illness sent by an evil witch
 Libahunt, Sutekskäija - werewolf
 Liiva-Annus or Surm - Death
 Linda - mother of Kalevipoeg
 Lummutis - ghost, wraith
 Luupainaja - incubus, nightmare
 Maa-alune - a creature living under the earth and causing illnesses
 Maajumalad - Gods of Earth
 Maaemä - Mother Earth
 Majauss - domestic grass-snake, protector spirit
 Mana - a hypothetical ruler of the dead
 Manala - land of the dead
 Manalane - inhabitant of the land of the dead
 Marras - spirit of death, predictor of death
 Mereveised - Sea cows
 Metsaema - Mother of Forest
 Metsavana - Old Man of the Forest
 Metsik - a fertility god
 Mumm - bogey, monster, ghost
 Murueide Tütred - daughters of Murueit, beautiful maidens
 Murueit - a female spirit of forest and earth, connected to the land of the dead
 Näkk - a shapeshifting water spirit, that often appears in a human shape, male or female, but sometimes also as an animal
 Nõid - witch
 Olevipoeg - a friend of Kalevipoeg, city builder, related to St Olaf
 Painaja - nightmare, incubus
 Pakane - Frost
 Pardiajaja - (from German-language Parteigänger) half-demonic warrior
 Peko - Seto god of fertility and brewing
 Peninukk - half-demonic warrior
 Penn
 Peremees - Master
 Pikne, Pikker -  Thunder, "The Long One"
 Piret - wife of Suur Tõll
 Põrguneitsi - literally: virgin of Hell
 Päike - Sun
 Rongo
 Rõugutaja - a female deity, protector of the rye crops, women in labor and the city of Narva
 Rukkihunt
 Salme
 Sulevipoeg - Sulev's son, friend of Kalevipoeg
 Suur Tõll - giant hero living in Saaremaa Island
 Taara Tharapita, Taarapita, Tarapita - the god of nature, sometimes considered supreme god. Mythological Osilian God of War
 Taevataat (literally Sky Father), Vanaisa ("Grandfather")
 Täht - Star
 Tallaja - trampler
 Tikutaja
 Tõnn - fairy, fertility god
 Tont - ghost
 Toonela - land of the dead
 Tooni - god of death, ruler of the dead
 Toor, Tooru - a deity known in western Estonia, related to Scandinavian Thor
 Tulbigas
 Turis
 Tuule-Emä - Mother Wind
 Tuuleisa - Father Wind
 Tuulispask - whirlwind
 Tuuslar - a sorcerer living in Finland
 Udres-Kudres - serf, called "Son of the Sun", hero of folksongs
 Uku - the supreme god
 Vanemuine -  the god of songs, art and literature
 Vanapagan  ("The Old Heathen") Vanatühi, ("The Old Empty one"), Vanakuri ("The Old Evil One"), Vanapoiss ("The Old Boy"), Vanasarvik ("The Old Horned One") in some texts also Vanataat ("The Old Father") - The Devil
 Varavedaja - loot carrier
 Varjuline - shadowling
 Veehaldjas - spirit of the water, the weaver of a spring Ahjualune
 Veteema – Mother of Waters
 Vetevana - Father of waters
 Vihelik
 Vilbus
 Virmalised - Polar Lights
 Viruskundra

Christian saints interpreted as gods:
 Jüri (St George) - god of agriculture
 Laurits (St Lawrence) - god of fire
 Mart (St Martin) - god of fertility
 Olev (St Olaf) - mythical builder of St. Olaf's Church
 Tõnn (St Anthony) - fertility god of the crops and pigs

Estonian mythical and magical objects

 White Ship (valge laev) - mythical ship that brings freedom or takes people away to a better land. This myth was born around 1860 when a small sect led by Juhan Leinberg (also known as Prophet Maltsvet) gathered near Tallinn to wait for a white ship to take them away.
 Hat of fingernails (küüntest kübar) - makes the bearer (usually  Vanatühi) invisible.
 Letter gloves (kirikindad) – were believed to have protective or magic powers, especially church letter gloves and the gloves that sailors wore. Letter gloves were (are) decorated with special geometric patterns and narrow red stripes; they have many whispers and spells in them because the crafter used to sing while making, dyeing and knitting yarn.
 Letter Belt (kirivöö) - the belt had the most ancient and magical patterns of all the craft items, red woven belts and laces were a common item to sacrifice (they were tied to the branches of holy trees). The belt was tied around parts of body that were sick and, pulled tightly around the waist, to protect and give strength to the bearer.
 Sacred stones - the last ice age has left a lot of great stones (erratics) in Estonia. Many of them were considered sacred and people came to them to sacrifice silver, blood, red ribbons and coins and ask for welfare and prosperity. Often, the stones have little holes in them, some of them probably used to place the sacrifice in. The meaning and function of the holes is however still disputed; according to paleoastronomer Heino Eelsalu they may have had a calendary function.
 Travelling forests - when people are mean, greedy and cruel, the forests will leave those places. The most stories about travelling forests are found in coastal areas of Estonia.

References

Further reading
"The Heavenly Wedding" Estonian Folktales (2005). Päär, P; Türnpu, A; Järv, R; Loigu, L. (ed). Varrak, Tallinn. .
 Valk, Ülo (2000). “Ex Ovo Omnia: Where Does the Balto-Finnic Cosmogony Originate? The Etiology of an Etiology”. In: Oral Tradition 15: 145-158.
 Viires, A., (1990). “Pseudomythology in Estonian Publicity in the 19th and 20th Century”. In: Ethnologia Europaea 21(1), pp. 135-143. doi: https://doi.org/10.16995/ee.1289

External links
The Hero of Esthonia, collected Estonian tales, edited by W. F. Kirby
 Taarapita - the great god of the Oeselians, an article by Urmas Sutrop
 Introduction to Baltic Folklore from the University of Toronto

 
Uralic mythology
Baltic gods